Sorbic acid, or 2,4-hexadienoic acid, is a natural organic compound used as a food preservative. It has the chemical formula  and the structure . It is a colourless solid that is slightly soluble in water and sublimes readily. It was first isolated from the unripe berries of the Sorbus aucuparia (rowan tree), hence its name.

Production
The traditional route to sorbic acid involves condensation of malonic acid and crotonaldehyde. It can also be prepared from isomeric hexadienoic acids, which are available via a nickel-catalyzed reaction of allyl chloride, acetylene, and carbon monoxide. The route used commercially, however, is from crotonaldehyde and ketene. An estimated 30,000 tons are produced annually.

History
Sorbic acid was isolated in 1859 by distillation of rowanberry oil by A. W. von Hofmann. This affords parasorbic acid, the lactone of sorbic acid, which he converted to sorbic acid by hydrolysis. Its antimicrobial activities were discovered in the late 1930s and 1940s, and it became commercially available in the late 1940s and 1950s. Beginning in the 1980s, sorbic acid and its salts were used as inhibitors of Clostridium botulinum in meat products to replace the use of nitrites, which can produce carcinogenic nitrosamines.

Properties and uses
With a pKa of 4.76, sorbic acid is about as acidic as acetic acid.

Sorbic acid and its salts, especially potassium sorbate and calcium sorbate, are antimicrobial agents often used as preservatives in food and drinks to prevent the growth of mold, yeast, and fungi. In general the salts are preferred over the acid form because they are more soluble in water, but the active form is the acid. The optimal pH for the antimicrobial activity is below pH 6.5. Sorbates are generally used at concentrations of 0.025% to 0.10%. Adding sorbate salts to food will, however, raise the pH of the food slightly so the pH may need to be adjusted to assure safety. It is found in foods such as various kinds of cheese, bread, muffins, donuts, pies, cookies, protein bars, syrups, lemonades, fruit juices, dried meats, sausages, nuggets, burgers, sandwiches, tacos, pizzas, smoked fish, margarine, sauces, soups, and more.

The E numbers are:
 E200 Sorbic acid
 E201 Sodium sorbate
 E202 Potassium sorbate
 E203 Calcium sorbate

Some molds (notably some Trichoderma and Penicillium strains) and yeasts are able to detoxify sorbates by decarboxylation, producing trans-1,3-pentadiene. The pentadiene manifests as a typical odor of kerosene or petroleum. Other detoxification reactions include reduction to 4-hexenol and 4-hexenoic acid.

Sorbic acid can also be used as an additive for cold rubber, and as an intermediate in the manufacture of some plasticizers and lubricants.

Safety
Sorbic acid and sorbate salts have a very low mammalian toxicity and carcinogenicity. Its  is estimated to be between 7.4 and 10 g/kg.

See also
 Sorbitol
 Polysorbate
 Acids in wine
 Parasorbic acid

References

External links
 Sorbic inchem.org

Enoic acids
Preservatives
E-number additives
Conjugated dienes